Mher Mkrtchyan (born ) is an Armenian track cyclist, representing Armenia at international competitions. He competed at the 2016 UEC European Track Championships in the scratch event.

References

1993 births
Living people
Armenian male cyclists
Armenian track cyclists
Place of birth missing (living people)